Two Hills is a town in central Alberta, Canada. Two Hills is primarily an agriculture-based community. It was named from the presence of two hills located near the town. Post office established in 1914.

Demographics 

In the 2016 Census of Population conducted by Statistics Canada, the Town of Two Hills recorded a population of 1,352 living in 399 of its 478 total private dwellings, a  change from its 2011 population of 1,379.

Notable people 

 Jackie Armstrong-Homeniuk MLA to the electoral district of Fort Saskatchewan-Vegreville in the 30th Alberta Legislature.

See also 
List of communities in Alberta
List of towns in Alberta

References

External links 

 
1929 establishments in Alberta
Towns in Alberta